Yun Jong-su (born 3 January 1962) is a North Korean football coach and former player who is head coach of the North Korea national football team. 

He also led North Korea during the 2006 and 2014 FIFA World Cup qualification campaigns and managed the North Korea U-23 team.

References

External links

1962 births
Living people
North Korean footballers
Association football midfielders
North Korea international footballers
1992 AFC Asian Cup players
Asian Games medalists in football
Footballers at the 1990 Asian Games
Asian Games silver medalists for North Korea
Medalists at the 1990 Asian Games
North Korea national football team managers
North Korean football managers